The 2011 Italian Athletics Championships was the 101st edition of the Italian Athletics Championships and were held in Turin on 25–26 June 2011.

Men

Women

References 
Results

External links 
 Italian Athletics Federation

Italian Athletics Championships
Athletics
Italian Athletics Outdoor Championships
Athletics competitions in Italy
June 2011 sports events in Italy